Phryganeidae is a family of giant caddisflies in the order Trichoptera. There are about 16 genera and at least 80 described species in Phryganeidae.

The type genus for Phryganeidae is Phryganea C. Linnaeus, 1758.

Genera

References

Further reading

 
 
 
 
 
 
 
 

Trichoptera families